Breaking Away is a 1980 American comedy-drama television series that was based on the 1979 film of the same name. It was created by Steve Tesich, who wrote the original film, and the film's director Peter Yates served as Executive Producer.

As a prequel, the series was set during the year prior to the events of the film. Shaun Cassidy took over the role of Dave Stohler (played by Dennis Christopher in the film), a young man crazy about bicycle racing and all things Italian. Barbara Barrie, Jackie Earle Haley and John Ashton reprised their roles from the film. The television series was set in Bloomington, Indiana, but was actually shot in Athens, Georgia.

The series was caught up in the 1980 Screen Actors Guild Strike and did not begin production until that fall. While heavily promoted by ABC, it was overlooked by TV audiences once it got on the air and suffered low ratings. It was canceled after eight episodes were filmed, though only seven episodes aired during its original run. ABC showed reruns of the series during the summer of 1981, and it was also rerun by A&E during 1985–1987.

Cast
 Shaun Cassidy as Dave Stohler
 Tom Wiggin as Mike
 Thom Bray as Cyril
 Jackie Earle Haley as Moocher
 Barbara Barrie as Evelyn Stohler, Dave's mother
 Vincent Gardenia as Raymond Stohler, Dave's father

Recurring 
 Dominique Dunne as Paulina Bornstein (episodes 2, 5, 6, & 8)
 Shelby Brammer as Nancy (episodes 1, 4, 5)
 Steve Doubet as Steve (episodes 2, 4)
 John Ashton as Roy, Mike's brother

Episodes

References

External links
 

1980s American comedy-drama television series
1980 American television series debuts
1981 American television series endings
American Broadcasting Company original programming
American prequel television series
American sports television series
Cycling television series
English-language television shows
Live action television shows based on films
Television series by 20th Century Fox Television
Television shows filmed in Georgia (U.S. state)
Television shows set in Indiana